Clayton Zane (born 12 July 1977) is an Australian association football coach and former player, who played as a striker.

In the 2001 season, he was the top scorer and awarded the Kniksen award as Striker of the Year in Norway. He earned 14 caps for the Australia national team, scoring six goals. His last club as a player was R.S.C. Anderlecht, where a two-year-long injury prematurely ended his career in late 2005.

Following his retirement from playing Zane worked as a coach at Newcastle Jets, serving as a head coach in 2014.

Club career
Zane was first brought to Europe as a relative unknown by Norwegian team Molde. After scoring no goals in 14 matches he was sold to Lillestrøm. In his first season in Lillestrøm he ended top scorer of the Norwegian Premier League with 17 goals and he was voted Norwegian Player of the Year some weeks later. He was then sold to Belgian club R.S.C. Anderlecht in 2002 where he scored twice in ten games.

International career
Zane represented the Australia national team at the 2001 Confederations Cup and is best remembered for scoring the only goal when Australia defeated subsequent champion France in the group stage.  He scored a hat-trick for Australia against Cook Islands in June 2000. Zane was a member of the Australian squad at the 2000 Summer Olympics in Sydney.

Coaching career
On 9 August 2011, it was announced that Zane had signed a contract to be the coach of the Newcastle Jets W-League team.

On 8 June 2012, he was announced as the youth team coach of the Newcastle United Jets Youth Squad.

In January 2014 Newcastle Jets head coach Gary van Egmond was sacked due to poor results and Zane was appointed interim head coach until the end of the season. The club chose to appoint Phil Stubbins as head coach of the club for the following season and returned Zane to the position of 1st team assistant coach.

Zane, along with goalkeeping coach Neil Young and strength & conditioning coach Andrew Packer were sacked as part of a club cleanout of players and staff.

On 7 September 2016, Zane became the caretaker coach of the Newcastle Jets after the termination of Scott Miller. Zane is regarded as well liked by the playing group and has a "Calming presence".

Career statistics

Scores and results list Australia's goal tally first, score column indicates score after each Zane goal.

Managerial statistics

Honours
Individual
Norwegian Premier League top scorer: 2001
Kniksen award: Striker of the Year 2001

References

External links
 
 Oz Football profile

1977 births
Living people
Sportspeople from Newcastle, New South Wales
Australian soccer players
Association football forwards
Australia international soccer players
Australia under-20 international soccer players
2000 OFC Nations Cup players
Footballers at the 2000 Summer Olympics
2001 FIFA Confederations Cup players
Olympic soccer players of Australia
Kniksen Award winners
National Soccer League (Australia) players
Belgian Pro League players
Eliteserien players
Newcastle Breakers FC players
Northern Spirit FC players
Lillestrøm SK players
Molde FK players
R.S.C. Anderlecht players
Australian soccer coaches
Newcastle Jets FC managers
A-League Men managers
Australian expatriate soccer players
Australian expatriate sportspeople in Norway
Expatriate footballers in Norway
Australian expatriate sportspeople in Belgium
Expatriate footballers in Belgium